The Grand Prix is an award of the Cannes Film Festival bestowed by the jury of the festival on one of the competing feature films. It is the second-most prestigious prize of the festival after the Palme d'Or, and it replaced 
the Special Jury Prize, which was considered a "second place" award until after this award was introduced.

History
The award was first presented in 1967. The prize was not awarded in 1977. The festival was not held at all in 2020. In 1968, no awards were given as the festival was called off mid-way due to the May 1968 events in France. Also, the jury vote was tied, and the prize was shared by two films on 10 occasions (1967, 1971, 1976, 1978, 1989, 1990, 1994, 2011, and 2021–22). Andrei Tarkovsky, Bruno Dumont, Nuri Bilge Ceylan, and Matteo Garrone have won the most awards in this category, each winning twice. Three directing teams have shared the award: Paolo and Vittorio Taviani for The Night of the Shooting Stars (1982), Jean-Pierre and Luc Dardenne for The Kid with a Bike (2011), and Joel and Ethan Coen for Inside Llewyn Davis (2013). Márta Mészáros was the first woman to have won the award, for 1984's Diary for My Children.

Since 1995, the official name of the award has been simply the Grand Prix, but it has had two other names since its creation in 1967: the Grand Prix Spécial du Jury (1967–1988) and the Grand Prix du Jury (1989–1994).

In addition, the award should not be confused with the Grand Prix du Festival International du Film (1939–1954; 1964–1974), which was the highest prize of the festival and a precursor to the Palme d'Or.

Winners

 Notes
 # Denotes Ex-aequo win

Multiple winners

The following individuals received two Grand Prix awards:

See also
Palme d'Or
Jury Prize

References

External links
 Cannes Film Festival official website

Cannes Film Festival
 
Lists of films by award